Epipsestis wernyi is a moth in the family Drepanidae. It is found in China (Shaanxi).

References

Moths described in 2007
Thyatirinae